The A232 highway is a highway in Nigeria. It is one of the east-west roads linking between two of the main south-north highways.

It is named from the two highways it links, the A2 highway and A3 highway.

Route
The A232 highway runs from the A2 at Benin City to the A3 at the outskirts of Enugu, the capital of Enugu State.

The main cities and towns on the route are Agbor, Asaba, Onitsha and Awka.

References

Highways in Nigeria
Enugu State